Mister Sister is a 2021 Canadian-American dramedy film by the filmmaker Mars Roberge.  It stars Jack James Busa, Princess Diandra and Debra Haden, along with the debut acting performance by Jim Sclavunos of Nick Cave and the Bad Seeds. It was also the last film performance by Ari Gold before his passing.

Plot 
A suicidal man from Milwaukee is given a second chance at life in NYC, working as a drag MC while learning the courage from the caring LGBTQ+ community to pursue his dreams, including a relationship with a tap dancing single mom.

Cast 
Mister Sister has an extensive cast with 111 roles.

Production

Writing 
Mister Sister was written by Mars Roberge over the winter of 2018 as a way to get over the grief of the recent passing of his friend, glam rock singing legend Brett Smiley.  During a Q & A at Winter Film Awards, Mars stated that "he [Brett Smiley] was my inspiration for making the movie because I wanted that song ["Space Ace"] in the movie so bad that I started with that song as a cover and then I worked backwards to think 'what kind of script can I do to get to that song' and that's how I made the movie." Mars describes Mister Sister as the result of drawing a line down the middle between his previous productions, The Little House That Could and Scumbag, where it has the crude humour of Scumbag mixed with the loving, caring LGBTQ+ community from The Little House That Could.

Filming 
Principal photography for Mister Sister began on 3 January 2020, in New York City under Roberge's film production company, World Domination Pictures. The entire movie was filmed over 12 days straight with the final day being the day before New York City's pandemic lockdown. Mister Sister was simultaneously filmed using a Red Weapon and Red Helium camera in 8K raw.

Release 
Mister Sister had its world premiere as the official closing night film for the 24th Dances With Films on 12 September 2021, held at TCL Chinese 6 Theatres in Hollywood. It then had its east coast premiere as the sold-out closing night film for the 10th Winter Film Awards International Film Festival held at Cinema Village on 30 September 2021. In 2022, Mister Sister was the closing film for the 27th Lower East Side Festival of the Arts held at Theater for the New City and then went onto play at the 6th L.A. Punk Film Festival.

World Domination Pictures released Mister Sister digitally in North America on November 30th, 2021 on Vimeo on Demand and has since been released worldwide on it as well as on Amazon Prime, Tubi, Popsy on Plex, Moodbox, OneHubTV, Typhoon on Demand, Mometu, Box Brazil Play and Nuclear Home Video.

Music 
Roberge released a music video of the song "Sad Sad Vampire" performed by Skunk in the Roses and containing footage from the film. A vinyl 12-inch single containing Rise NYC's "Rock 'n' Roll Manifesto (Thee Majesty Hip Dub Mix by Genesis Breyer P-Orridge)" and the b-side Binary Starr System's "What's Da T? (David J's Dub Science Mix)" was released through World Domination Records.

The score was written by Linda Lamb who also wrote the intro song to Roberge's prior feature, Scumbag. The final song performed in the movie is a cover of Brett Smiley's "Space Ace" performed by Jack James Busa + The Pious. The soundtrack also contains several songs written by Mars Roberge from his various music projects.

Reception 
OriginalRock.net reviewed the movie, writing that "Mister Sister will relentlessly tickle your senses with laughter, tears and a whole load of street rocking drag queen chit chat. Borrow, buy or steal it, but just f*cking see it."

Unseen Films reviewed the movie, writing that "This is a one of a kind film in the best sort of way. This look at people living and surviving in New York feels more like a documentary than a feature. While I know there was some sort of script involved, I suspect everything was tweaked based upon the wonderful cast. Everyone has to be playing a version of themselves. I say this because no screenwriter could ever get away with this wild and crazy collection of people. Additionally the way everyone looks is the way people look in real life and not movie life."

MyIndieProductions reviewed the movie, writing that "Mister Sister is simply a joy, a fun journey covering some serious issues, as well as introducing some of its audience to a world they may not otherwise be exposed to, which in my opinion is commendable."

Film Threat reviewed the movie, writing that "Although Mister Sister lags, the real stars of the show, the drag queens, do not and are head to toe amazing. They take every scene seriously, along with their hair, make-up, clothes, jewelry, and dialogue."

Awards 
 Best NYC Film at the Winter Film Awards International Film Festival (won)
 Best Actor at the Winter Film Awards International Film Festival (nominated, Jack James Busa)
 Best LGBTQ Film at L.A. Punk Film Festival (won).

References

External links 
 
 

2021 films
American comedy-drama films
Canadian comedy-drama films
English-language Canadian films
American LGBT-related films
Canadian LGBT-related films
2021 LGBT-related films
LGBT-related comedy-drama films
Drag (clothing)-related films
2020s English-language films
2020s Canadian films
2020s American films